Henrik Kromann Toft (born 11 July 1968) is a Danish archer. He competed at the 1988 Summer Olympics and the 1992 Summer Olympics.

References

External links
 

1968 births
Living people
Danish male archers
Olympic archers of Denmark
Archers at the 1988 Summer Olympics
Archers at the 1992 Summer Olympics
Sportspeople from Aalborg
20th-century Danish people